Clifford Ralph Robinson (December 16, 1966August 29, 2020) was an American professional basketball player who played 18 seasons in the National Basketball Association (NBA). Selected in the second round of the 1989 NBA draft, he played the first eight seasons of his career with the Portland Trail Blazers, followed by stints with the Phoenix Suns, Detroit Pistons, Golden State Warriors, and New Jersey Nets. Robinson received the NBA Sixth Man of the Year Award in 1993 and was selected as an NBA All-Star in 1994. He played college basketball for the UConn Huskies.

College career
Robinson played four seasons at the University of Connecticut beginning in 1985. The Huskies won the 1988 National Invitation Tournament championship, and he was named to the all-tournament team. Robinson was later named to UConn's All-Century men's basketball team. On February 5, 2007, Robinson's number "00" was retired at Gampel Pavilion during halftime of a UConn basketball game against Syracuse as part of the "Huskies of Honor" ceremony which recognized personal accomplishments of 13 former players and 3 coaches.

Professional career

Portland Trail Blazers (1989–1997) 
Robinson was selected with the 36th overall pick in the second round of the 1989 NBA draft by the Portland Trail Blazers. Robinson played for the Trail Blazers for eight seasons. Portland made the playoffs each year he was on the team, and played in the NBA Finals in 1990 and 1992. Robinson won the Sixth Man of the Year Award in 1992–93 after averaging 19.1 points, 6.6 rebounds and a career-best 1.99 blocks per game. He was an All-Star with the team in 1994. Following Game 4 of the 1992 Western Conference Finals against the Utah Jazz, Robinson performed a victory dance that he later told press was named the "Uncle Cliffy". The nickname stuck with Robinson for the rest of his career. Following a game against the Golden State Warriors on February 22, 1995, Robinson was forced to end his 461 iron man streak of consecutive games played since the start of his career. This streak stands as a franchise record for the Trail Blazers.

Phoenix Suns (1997–2001)
Robinson signed with the Phoenix Suns as a free agent on August 25, 1997, where he remained for four more seasons. The highlight of his tenure with the Suns was registering a career-best 50 points against the Denver Nuggets on January 16, 2000. He became the oldest player in NBA history to register his first 50-point game, aged 33 years and 2 months.

Detroit Pistons (2001–2003)
Robinson was traded to the Detroit Pistons on June 29, 2001, in exchange for Jud Buechler and John Wallace.

Golden State Warriors (2003–2005)
Robinson was traded to the Golden State Warriors on August 21, 2003, along with Pepe Sánchez, in exchange for Bob Sura. Although he played all 82 games during the regular season, it would be the first season in his career where he would not participate in the NBA playoffs.

New Jersey Nets (2005–2007)
On February 14, 2005, Golden State traded Robinson to the New Jersey Nets in exchange for two second-round draft picks. He played with the Nets for two more seasons until he was released by the team in July 2007. Robinson then retired.

Suspensions
Robinson was arrested for marijuana possession and driving under the influence in February 2001 and received a one-game suspension. Robinson was also suspended for five games in February 2005 while playing for Golden State, and was suspended for five games during the NBA playoffs on May 12, 2006 for violating terms of the league's drug policy for the second time in two seasons.

NBA career statistics

Regular season

|-
| style="text-align:left;"| 
| style="text-align:left;"| Portland
| 82 || 0 || 19.1 || .397 || .273 || .550 || 3.8 || .9 || .6 || .6 || 9.1
|-
| style="text-align:left;"| 
| style="text-align:left;"| Portland
| 82 || 11 || 23.7 || .463 || .316 || .653 || 4.3 || 1.8 || 1.0 || .9 || 11.7
|-
| style="text-align:left;"| 
| style="text-align:left;"| Portland
| 82 || 7 || 25.9 || .466 || .091 || .664 || 5.1 || 1.7 || 1.0 || 1.3 || 12.4
|-
| style="text-align:left;"| 
| style="text-align:left;"| Portland
| 82 || 12 || 31.4 || .473 || .247 || .690 || 6.6 || 2.2 || 1.2 || 2.0 || 19.1
|-
| style="text-align:left;"| 
| style="text-align:left;"| Portland
| 82 || 64 || 34.8 || .457 || .245 || .765 || 6.7 || 1.9 || 1.4 || 1.4 || 20.1
|-
| style="text-align:left;"| 
| style="text-align:left;"| Portland
| 75 || 73 || 36.3 || .452 || .371 || .694 || 5.6 || 2.6 || 1.1 || 1.1 || 21.3
|-
| style="text-align:left;"| 
| style="text-align:left;"| Portland
| 78 || 76 || 38.2 || .423 || .378 || .664 || 5.7 || 2.4 || 1.1 || .9 || 21.1
|-
| style="text-align:left;"| 
| style="text-align:left;"| Portland
| 81 || 79 || 38.0 || .426 || .346 || .696 || 4.0 || 3.2 || 1.2 || .8 || 15.1
|-
| style="text-align:left;"| 
| style="text-align:left;"| Phoenix
| 80 || 64 || 29.5 || .479 || .321 || .689 || 5.1 || 2.1 || 1.2 || 1.1 || 14.2
|-
| style="text-align:left;"| 
| style="text-align:left;"| Phoenix
| 50 || 35 || 34.8 || .475 || .417 || .697 || 4.5 || 2.6 || 1.5 || 1.2 || 16.4
|-
| style="text-align:left;"| 
| style="text-align:left;"| Phoenix
| 80 || 67 || 35.5 || .464 || .370 || .782 || 4.5 || 2.8 || 1.1 || .8 || 18.5
|-
| style="text-align:left;"| 
| style="text-align:left;"| Phoenix
| 82 || 82 || 33.5 || .422 || .361 || .709 || 4.1 || 2.9 || 1.1 || 1.0 || 16.4
|-
| style="text-align:left;"| 
| style="text-align:left;"| Detroit
| 80 || 80 || 35.7 || .425 || .378 || .694 || 4.8 || 2.5 || 1.1 || 1.2 || 14.6
|-
| style="text-align:left;"| 
| style="text-align:left;"| Detroit
| 81 || 69 || 34.9 || .398 || .336 || .676 || 3.9 || 3.3 || 1.1 || 1.1 || 12.2
|-
| style="text-align:left;"| 
| style="text-align:left;"| Golden State
| 82 || 82 || 34.7 || .387 || .357 || .711 || 4.1 || 3.3 || .9 || .9 || 11.8
|-
| style="text-align:left;"| 
| style="text-align:left;"| Golden State
| 42 || 29 || 26.0 || .398 || .331 || .603 || 2.7 || 1.8 || 1.0 || .9 || 8.5
|-
| style="text-align:left;"| 
| style="text-align:left;"| New Jersey
| 29 || 0 || 20.7 || .361 || .379 || .692 || 3.3 || 1.0 || .6 || .5 || 6.0
|-
| style="text-align:left;"| 
| style="text-align:left;"| New Jersey
| 80 || 13 || 23.3 || .427 || .343 || .658 || 3.3 || 1.1 || .6 || .5 || 6.9
|-
| style="text-align:left;"| 
| style="text-align:left;"| New Jersey
| 50 || 1 || 19.1 || .372 || .379 || .444 || 2.4 || 1.0 || .2 || .5 || 4.1
|- class="sortbottom"
| style="text-align:center;" colspan=2| Career
| 1380 || 844 || 30.8 || .438 || .356 || .689 || 4.6 || 2.2 || 1.0 || 1.0 || 14.2
|- class="sortbottom"
| style="text-align:center;" colspan=2| All-Star
| 1 || 0 || 18.0 || .625 || .000 || – || 2.0 || 5.0 || 1.0 || .0 || 10.0

Playoffs

|-
| style="text-align:left;"| 1990
| style="text-align:left;"| Portland
| 21 || 6 || 18.6 || .358 || .000 || .558 || 4.1 || 1.1 || .9 || 1.1 || 6.5
|-
| style="text-align:left;"| 1991
| style="text-align:left;"| Portland
| 16 || 0 || 22.1 || .538 || .333 || .551 || 3.9 || 1.1 || .4 || 1.0 || 10.3
|-
| style="text-align:left;"| 1992
| style="text-align:left;"| Portland
| 21 || 0 || 24.9 || .462 || .167 || .571 || 4.2 || 2.0 || 1.0 || 1.0 || 10.8
|-
| style="text-align:left;"| 1993
| style="text-align:left;"| Portland
| 4 || 0 || 32.8 || .262 || .000 || .409 || 4.3 || 1.5 || 1.5 || 1.8 || 10.3
|-
| style="text-align:left;"| 1994
| style="text-align:left;"| Portland
| 4 || 4 || 37.3 || .412 || .222 || .875 || 6.3 || 2.5 || .8 || 1.5 || 16.3
|-
| style="text-align:left;"| 1995
| style="text-align:left;"| Portland
| 3 || 3 || 39.7 || .362 || .235 || .563 || 6.3 || 2.7 || .7 || .3 || 15.7
|-
| style="text-align:left;"| 1996
| style="text-align:left;"| Portland
| 5 || 5 || 36.2 || .344 || .261 || .757 || 3.6 || 1.6 || 1.4 || 1.0 || 15.2
|-
| style="text-align:left;"| 1997
| style="text-align:left;"| Portland
| 4 || 4 || 40.3 || .362 || .188 || .688 || 6.8 || 3.0 || .5 || 1.0 || 12.0
|-
| style="text-align:left;"| 1998
| style="text-align:left;"| Phoenix
| 4 || 4 || 23.0 || .273 || .000 || .778 || 3.0 || .8 || .8 || .5 || 6.3
|-
| style="text-align:left;"| 1999
| style="text-align:left;"| Phoenix
| 3 || 3 || 39.0 || .475 || .222 || .636 || 5.3 || 2.7 || 2.0 || .3 || 15.7
|-
| style="text-align:left;"| 2000
| style="text-align:left;"| Phoenix
| 9 || 9 || 37.0 || .386 || .325 || .733 || 6.0 || 2.1 || 1.2 || .8 || 17.6
|-
| style="text-align:left;"| 2001
| style="text-align:left;"| Phoenix
| 4 || 4 || 28.5 || .420 || .250 || .636 || 4.0 || 1.0 || 1.5 || .5 || 15.0
|-
| style="text-align:left;"| 2002
| style="text-align:left;"| Detroit
| 10 || 10 || 40.9 || .363 || .340 || .800 || 3.0 || 2.9 || 1.8 || 1.9 || 13.2
|-
| style="text-align:left;"| 2003
| style="text-align:left;"| Detroit
| 17 || 17 || 30.8 || .358 || .373 || .595 || 2.7 || 2.9 || .9 || .8 || 9.3
|-
| style="text-align:left;"| 2005
| style="text-align:left;"| New Jersey
| 4 || 0 || 17.8 || .407 || .286 || 1.000 || 2.5 || 1.3 || .8 || .3 || 7.0
|-
| style="text-align:left;"| 2006
| style="text-align:left;"|New Jersey
| 8 || 0 || 24.8 || .333 || .316 || .800 || 3.3 || .6 || 1.1 || .4 || 4.5
|-
| style="text-align:left;"| 2007
| style="text-align:left;"| New Jersey
| 4 || 0 || 5.0 || .167 || .500 || .0 || .0 || .0 || .3 || .0 || .8
|- class="sortbottom"
| style="text-align:center;" colspan=2| Career
| 141 || 69 || 27.6 || .393 || .298 || .629 || 3.9 || 1.8 || 1.0 || .9 || 10.3

Retrospective
Robinson held career NBA per-game averages of 14.2 points, 4.6 rebounds, 1.05 steals, and 1.03 blocks. His 1,380 games played are the 13th most all time in the NBA. and second among players eligible for the 2015 Basketball Hall of Fame (after Kevin Willis). At the end of the 2013–14 NBA season, his 42,561 minutes played in the NBA ranked him 19th among all players, 14th among retired players, and first among players eligible for the 2016 class of the Basketball Hall of Fame.

Robinson was one of only two players drafted in the 1980s that was still active in the league in 2007, with the other being Kevin Willis. He played in the NBA Playoffs in all but one of his 18 seasons in the league, with his 2003–04 campaign with the Golden State Warriors being the exception. As of the 2014 NBA Playoffs, his 141 playoff games played ranked him 16th among inactive players not yet in the Hall of Fame, although he had a low .393 field goal percentage (compared to .438 during the regular season) and 2.1 Win Shares in those games.

At 6'10", he was the tallest player to make more than 1,000 three-pointers until he was surpassed by Dirk Nowitzki and Rashard Lewis; Robinson made 1,253 threes in his career. Among players who qualified for the 2015 Class of the Basketball Hall of Fame, Robinson ranked fifth among all players for field goals made and first among those 6'10" or taller.

Robinson is one of seven players to record 1,300 steals and 1,300 blocked shots in their ABA/NBA career - the others are Kevin Garnett, Julius Erving, Bobby Jones, Hakeem Olajuwon, David Robinson and Ben Wallace.

Survivor
Robinson was a contestant in the 28th installment of the American reality television series Survivor (filmed in 2013 and broadcast the following year). The theme for the season was Brains vs. Brawn vs. Beauty, and Robinson was placed on the "Brawn" tribe, Aparri. Although he did not initially plan to reveal his identity, he was recognized by Yung "Woo" Hwang, who admitted to being a fan of Robinson. Once his identity was revealed, he did not attempt to cover it up. After a tribe swap, Trish Hegarty revealed her strong distaste for Robinson and convinced fellow tribemate Tony Vlachos to vote with her to eliminate him. He was the fifth contestant of the season to be voted out, finishing in 14th place.

Trip to North Korea
In 2014, Robinson was named to a team assembled by Dennis Rodman as part of his "basketball diplomacy" effort in North Korea with the job of playing an exhibition match against the Northern Korean Senior National Basketball Team to celebrate the birthday of Kim Jong-un. The team also included Kenny Anderson, Vin Baker, Craig Hodges, Doug Christie, Sleepy Floyd, Charles D. Smith, and four "streetballers".

Cannabis

During his post-basketball life, Robinson became an entrepreneur in the cannabis industry, selling assorted cannabis products under his "Uncle Cliffy" brand name. He was also an advocate for the legalization of cannabis, supporting efforts to reform cannabis laws in the states of Oregon and Connecticut. During his time in the NBA, Robinson used cannabis to help relieve pain and anxiety, and to avoid the undesirable side effects caused by pharmaceutical drugs. He partially attributed the longevity of his NBA career to his use of cannabis.

Robinson appeared in the 2019 Netflix film Grass Is Greener, which examines the history of cannabis prohibition in the United States.

Personal life
On September 21, 2003, Robinson married Heather Lufkins on the island of Barbados. His son Isaiah Robinson played basketball for the Jefferson High School Democrats in Portland and the Houston Baptist Huskies.

As of 2017, Robinson resided in the West Hills area of Portland, Oregon.

Health issues and death

Robinson suffered a stroke in March 2017 that paralyzed the left side of his body, but he soon recovered much of his arm and leg movement. He had a tumor removed from his jaw in March 2018.

In March 2019, Robinson underwent surgery for cancer treatment. He died of lymphoma on August 29, 2020, at the age of 53.

See also
List of National Basketball Association career blocks leaders
List of National Basketball Association career games played leaders
List of oldest and youngest National Basketball Association players

References

External links
 NBA bio
 

1966 births
2020 deaths
African-American basketball players
American cannabis activists
American men's basketball players
Basketball players from Buffalo, New York
Businesspeople in the cannabis industry
Centers (basketball)
Deaths from cancer in Oregon
Deaths from lymphoma
Detroit Pistons players
Golden State Warriors players
National Basketball Association All-Stars
New Jersey Nets players
Phoenix Suns players
Portland Trail Blazers draft picks
Portland Trail Blazers players
Power forwards (basketball)
Small forwards
Survivor (American TV series) contestants
UConn Huskies men's basketball players
20th-century African-American sportspeople
21st-century African-American people